The Journal of the American Society of Questioned Document Examiners is a peer-reviewed academic journal that publishes original research papers, technical aids, reviews of current practises or procedures, as well as historical articles relating to forensic document examination. The journal was established in June 1998 and is published biannually by the American Society of Questioned Document Examiners. The editor-in-chief is  Dr. Linton A. Mohammed.

References

External links 
 

Biannual journals
English-language journals
Publications established in 1998
Criminology journals